Fixed rate may refer to:
Fixed-rate mortgage, a type of mortgage loan
Fixed interest rate loan, a type of loan
Fixed rate bond, a type of bond